Brantôme (1931–1952) was a French Thoroughbred racehorse and prominent sire. He was unbeaten at ages 2 and 3 and is ranked among the best French horses ever.

Background
Brantome was sired by Irish stallion Blandford (1919–1935) out of the mare Vitamine. He was owned by the Haras de Meautry stable of Édouard Alphonse de Rothschild. He was named for the city of Brantôme, Dordogne.

Racing career
As a two-year-old, Brantôme won the Prix Robert Papin, Grand Critérium and the Prix Morny. His major victories at age three include the French 2000 Guineas, the Prix Lupin, the Prix Royal-Oak, the country's most prestigious horse race, the Prix de l'Arc de Triomphe plus other significant races.

In 1935, at age four, Brantôme suffered his first loss. Entered in the Ascot Gold Cup in England, eleven days before the race Brantôme got loose from the stables and was not caught until after he had galloped into downtown Chantilly. The horse lost three shoes and sustained a bad cut. Despite this, his owner still sent him to compete in the Ascot Gold Cup where he finished out of the money.

Stud record
After winning twelve of the fourteen races he competed in, Brantôme was retired to stand at stud. During the German occupation of France in World War II the Nazis seized some of the best racehorses in France. They shipped more than six hundred thoroughbreds out of the country. Some went to Hungary, but most were shipped to Germany for racing or for breeding at the German National Stud. Among them was Brantôme, who was recovered in 1945 at the end of the war.

Brantôme was the sire of Vieux Manoir who was the grandsire of All Along and Ivanjica as well as Val de Loire who was a Leading sire in France three times and the damsire of Shergar. Brantôme was also the great-grandsire of Exbury.

Brantôme died on 3 July 1952 at the age of twenty-one.

References
 Brantome's pedigree and racing stats

1931 racehorse births
1952 racehorse deaths
Racehorses bred in Calvados (department)
Racehorses trained in France
Arc winners

Thoroughbred family 27-a
Chefs-de-Race